Fábio Júnior Pereira (born 20 November 1977), commonly known as just Fábio Júnior, is a Brazilian football pundit and retired footballer who played as a forward.

Career
Born in the São Pedro do Avaí district of  Manhuaçu, Fábio Júnior began playing professional football in his home state, Minas Gerais. He has played for each of the three large professional clubs based in the capital of Belo Horizonte, Cruzeiro, Atlético Mineiro and América-MG.

He was found using a fake passport to play as an EU-player in Italy, he was then fined and banned in Italy football for a season, although he never played again in Italy.

Career statistics

Club

International

Honours
Cruzeiro
 Copa Sul-Minas: 2002
 Campeonato Mineiro: 1997, 1998, 2002
 Copa do Brasil: 2000

Brasiliense
 Campeonato Brasiliense: 2008

Al-Wahda
 UAE League: 2005

References

External links

1977 births
Living people
Sportspeople from Minas Gerais
Brazilian footballers
Association football forwards
Brazil international footballers
Campeonato Brasileiro Série A players
Campeonato Brasileiro Série B players
Clube Atlético Mineiro players
Cruzeiro Esporte Clube players
VfL Bochum players
Bundesliga players
2. Bundesliga players
Sociedade Esportiva Palmeiras players
A.S. Roma players
Serie A players
Kashima Antlers players
J1 League players
Al Wahda FC players
Hapoel Tel Aviv F.C. players
Esporte Clube Bahia players
Vitória S.C. players
Brasiliense Futebol Clube players
América Futebol Clube (MG) players
Boa Esporte Clube players
Primeira Liga players
UAE Pro League players
Brazilian expatriate footballers
Brazilian expatriate sportspeople in Germany
Expatriate footballers in Germany
Brazilian expatriate sportspeople in Italy
Expatriate footballers in Italy
Brazilian expatriate sportspeople in Japan
Expatriate footballers in Japan
Brazilian expatriate sportspeople in Israel
Expatriate footballers in Israel
Brazilian expatriate sportspeople in the United Arab Emirates
Expatriate footballers in the United Arab Emirates